The Saho language (Tigrinya: ሳሆኛ/ቋንቋ ሳሆ) is an Afro-Asiatic language spoken in Eritrea, Sudan and Ethiopia. It belongs to the family's Cushitic branch.

Overview
Saho is spoken natively by the Saho people. Traditionally, they inhabit the territory in Eritrea bounded by the bay of Erafayle in the east, the Laacasi Gade valleys in the south, and the Eritrean highlands to the west (the Shimejana district on the eastern flank of the South- or Debub region in what was formerly known as Akele Guzai province).

This speech area is bordered by other Afro-Asiatic-speaking communities, with Tigre speakers on the west and Afar speakers on the east. In Ethiopia, Saho is primarily spoken in the Tigray Region. It has about 250,000 speakers in total and four main dialects: Northern dialect, mainly spoken by Casawurta,Tharuuca, Casabat Care etc., Central dialect is mainly spoken by Faqhat Xarak of Minifere,and Southern dialect mainly spoken by Minifire, Xazo, Dabrti-meela, Irob, Sancafe. The Saho also use the Arabic (special now Latin letters) to document their history and render information. Also recently the language is being used on the cyberspace as a tool of communication. And there is on website completely designed with saho language.

Saho is so closely related to the Cushitic Afar language, spoken as a mother tongue by the Afar people, that some linguists regard the two tongues as dialects of a single "Saho–Afar language". Regardless, it has been shown that at least in their basic lexicon the two can be cleanly separated.

Writing systems
Saho has three written versions: a version in the Latin alphabet, official in Eritrea; a version in the Ge'ez script, official in Ethiopia; and a version in the Ajami script with no official recognition.

Notes

External links
 World Atlas of Language Structures information on Saho
 Saho -LLACAN (with map)

Further reading
 William E. Welmers.  1952.  "Notes on the structure of Saaho," Word 8:145-162.

East Cushitic languages
Languages of Eritrea
Languages of Ethiopia